David Greig (born 1793) was a Scottish politician.

Born in Perth, David was the son of Bailie James Greig.  He worked as a watchmaker and jeweller.  He was also involved with shipping in the burgh's port.  He stood in the 1839 Perth by-election for the Whigs, winning the seat, but he did not stand at the subsequent 1841 UK general election.  During the same period, he served as Provost of Perth.  He later became a director of the Scottish Provincial Assurance Company.

References

1793 births
Year of death missing
People from Perth, Scotland
Scottish watchmakers (people)
UK MPs 1837–1841
Whig (British political party) MPs for Scottish constituencies